Kevin Eugene Hagen (born March 8, 1960) is a former pitcher in Major League Baseball who played from  through  for the St. Louis Cardinals. Listed at 6' 2", 185 lb., Hagen batted and threw right-handed. He attended Bellevue Community College.

In a two-season career, Hagen posted a 3–2 record with a 4.25 ERA in 13 appearances, including four starts, giving up 17 runs (three unearned) on 43 hits and eight walks while striking out nine in  innings of work.

External links
Baseball Reference
Retrosheet

1960 births
Living people
St. Louis Cardinals players
Baseball players from Washington (state)
Bellevue Bulldogs baseball players
Major League Baseball pitchers
Gastonia Cardinals players
Arkansas Travelers players
Louisville Redbirds players
Maine Guides players
Portland Beavers players
Tucson Toros players
Oklahoma City 89ers players
Sportspeople from Renton, Washington